Goodlife Health Clubs is a chain of health clubs, with more than 80 locations in Australia and also in New Zealand.

See also
Australian Institute of Personal Trainers

References

External links

Health clubs in Australia
Health care companies of New Zealand
Health care companies established in 2007
2007 establishments in Australia